C. boissieri may refer to:

Colchicum boissieri
Cordia boissieri

See also